Jean de Nynauld was a French physician who wrote an important work on lycanthropy in 1615 titled De la lycanthropie, transformation et extase des sorciers (On lycanthropy, transformation and ecstasy of witches). de Nynauld saw lycanthropy as a form of mental illness rather than a form of magic.

A critical edition of the work, edited by Nicole Jacques-Lefevre and Maxime Preaud, was published by Frenesie in Paris, 1990.

References

External links
De la lycanthropie, transformation et extase des sorciers. Scanned version from Real Academia de Medicina y Cirugía de Sevilla.

1500s births
1600s deaths
17th-century French physicians
Werewolves
Year of birth missing